Several ships of the Royal Navy have borne the name Hearty -

 , a 12-gun brig, sold in 1816
 , a  that became a Post Office Packet Service packet, sailing out of Falmouth, Cornwall. On 12 September 1827, she sailed from Falmouth for Jamaica, under the command of Lieutenant Jewry or Jawry, RN, and with 35 persons on board. She was sighted within a few days sail of Barbados, but never reached that island. She disappeared, believed to have foundered with all hands, in 1827.
 , a paddle tug, formerly Merry Monarch, purchased in 1855; broken up in 1876
 , a surveying ship
 , a drifter, hired 1915-1919
 , an

Citations

References

 

Royal Navy ship names